{{Infobox television
| image                = Virgin Media News at 8.00.jpg
| caption              =
| alt_name             = Virgin Media News at 7.00Virgin Media Evening News
| genre                = 
| director             = 
| presenter            = Claire Brock
| theme_music_composer = 
| opentheme            = 
| endtheme             = 
| composer             = 
| country              = Ireland
| language             = English
| executive_producer   = 
| producer             = 
| editor               = 
| location             = Dublin, Ireland
| camera               = Multi-camera
| runtime              = 25 minutes
| company              = Virgin Media Television
| channel              = Virgin Media One
| picture_format       = 16:9
| audio_format         = 
| first_aired          = 
| last_aired           =
| preceded_by          = 
| followed_by          = 
| related              = Virgin Media NewsVirgin Media News at 5.30 
}}Virgin Media News at 7.00 (formerly News at 8.00) is the main primetime news programme on the Irish television network Virgin Media One (formerly known as "TV3"). It is produced by the Virgin Media News division.

The News at 7.00, presented by main newscaster Claire Brock, is a thirty-minute news programme covering Irish national and international news stories, broadcast at 7pm from Monday to Friday. It was previously broadcast at 8pm, before being pushed back in March 2022 to accommodate a permanent new schedule featuring extended episodes of UK soaps Coronation Street and Emmerdale.

History

On 30 March 2015, TV3 announced that it will begin broadcasting a new main evening news programme at 8pm every weeknight.

In December 2016, the show was moved over to sister channel 3e after TV3 regained the rights to Coronation Street and Emmerdale. At the end of December 2016, TV3 News at 8 was discontinued.

A major rebrand of the entire TV3 Group took place in August 2018, when the company was renamed as Virgin Media Television, with all news output rebranded as Virgin Media News. News at 8.00'' returned on the day of the rebrand, replacing the News at 7, which aired on Be3.

Newscasters

Main newscaster

Relief newscasters

References

1998 establishments in Ireland
Irish television news shows
Virgin Media Television (Ireland) original programming